Uzi Feinerman (born 1924, died 8 April 1975) was an Israeli politician who served as a member of the Knesset for the Alignment between 1969 and 1975.

Biography
Born in Kfar Yehezkel during the Mandate era, Feinerman joined the Haganah during his youth, and during the 1948 Arab-Israeli War served as a battalion commander.

In 1955 he began training new immigrants in moshavim, and between 1958 and 1969 served as the secretary of the Moshavim Movement. In 1969 he was elected to the Knesset on the Alignment list. After becoming an MK he established and headed the Knesset's Agricultural Forum. He retained his seat in the 1973 elections, but died in April 1975 while in office. His seat was taken by Amos Hadar.

References

External links
 

1924 births
1975 deaths
Jews in Mandatory Palestine
Moshavniks
Haganah members
Israeli soldiers
Moshavim movement secretaries
Alignment (Israel) politicians
Members of the 7th Knesset (1969–1974)
Members of the 8th Knesset (1974–1977)